Bad Gandersheim (Eastphalian: Ganderssen) is a town in southern Lower Saxony, Germany, located in the district of Northeim. , it had a population of 9,492.

Bad Gandersheim has many half-timbered houses and is located on the German Timber-Frame Road. The town contains an airport as well.

Geography 
The town of Bad Gandersheim lies between the Leine Uplands, Weser Uplands, and Harz Foreland in the valley of the Gande River, into which its tributary, the Eterna, empties within the town's territory. To the north lies the Heber Ridge. The borough is predominantly hilly.

Borough divisions 
The borough of Bad Gandersheim consists of the following subdivisions based on the surrounding villages:

History
The town dates back to 852, when Gandersheim Abbey, a house of secular canonesses, was created in nearby Brunshausen by Liudolf, Duke of Saxony and his wife Oda. The first abbey church in the town proper was begun in 856. In 990 the abbey received the market and tax rights. During the 10th century, Gandersheim was one of the most important towns of Saxony; the first German poet Hrosvit lived and worked here until 973. In 1159 Gandersheim was first mentioned as a town.

When a mineral spring was discovered in 1240, Pope Gregory IX initiated the erection of the Holy Spirit hospital. Around 1330, the Dukes of Brunswick built a castle as a secular counterbalance to the abbey church. This building serves today as the magistrates' court and youth correctional facility.

In the late 19th century, the town began to become known for the curative powers of its mineral springs, and in 1932 Gandersheim received the official right to call itself a spa town, thus Bad Gandersheim, on account of these springs.

In the summer of 1926 there was a three-day "Roswitha Memorial Celebration in 1000-year old Gandersheim". This was the first time the medieval author was used as a symbolic figure for the town. Similar celebrations took place in 1930 and 1933; these had clear national-socialist themes: "German Culture" versus "Jewish-Communist Decadence."

During World War 2, from October 1944 to April 1945, the town was the site of a subcamp of the Buchenwald Concentration Camp that produced aircraft parts.

In 1952, the town celebrated  the 1100-year jubilee of the founding of the monastery by Liudolf. A history play, The Song of Gandersheim, was presented in the market square. This was the unofficial prelude to the summer festival Gandersheimer Domfestspiele, which has been presented yearly on the plaza in front of the abbey church since 1959. Since this time, it has established itself as Lower Saxony's largest professional summer theatre festival. In 2006, its four major productions were attended by approximately 55,000 theatre visitors.

Mayors

1968–1970: Hans-Dieter Gottschalk (1932-2005)
1974–1986: Heinz Köhler (1919-2010)
1986–1991: Uwe Schwarz (SPD)
1991–1996: Rudolf Hermes (CDU)
1996–2001: Uwe Schwarz (SPD)
2001–2014: Heinz-Gerhard Ehmen (independent)
2014-incumbent: Franziska Schwarz (SPD)

Twin towns

Bad Gandersheim is twinned with:
  Rotselaar, Belgium
  Skegness, United Kingdom

Notable residents

 Wilhelm Keitel (1882-1946), field marshal of Nazi Germany, executed for war crimes
 Bodewin Keitel (1888-1953), general, brother of Wilhelm Keitel
 Herbert Otto Gille (1897-1966), general of the Waffen-SS
 Wolfgang Liebe (1911-2005), an aircraft engineer, aerodynamics, inventor of the wing fence

External links

References

Northeim (district)
Spa towns in Germany
Duchy of Brunswick